The violetears are hummingbirds of the genus Colibri. They are medium to large species found in Mexico, and Central and northern South America. The Mexican violetear occasionally wanders as far north as the United States and even Canada.

Violetears have ample rounded tails and short or medium black bills. Three of the four species have a mainly green plumage. The males have a violet blue patch running back and down from the eye, which is erected when they are excited, and a glittering throat patch. The female plumage is generally like the male's, but the ear and throat patches are smaller.

Violetears build substantial cup nests into which two white eggs are laid. They have loud persistent songs, often repetitions of double notes.

These birds come readily to artificial nectar feeders, and show no fear of humans. They are aggressively territorial, and at feeders or flowering shrubs they spend much time chasing other hummingbirds, rather than feeding.

Species 
The genus contains five species:

References

 Hilty,  Birds of Venezuela, 
 Stiles and Skutch,  A guide to the birds of Costa Rica  
Birds of the World, 1999 Edition